John Robin Jenkins  (11 September 1912 – 24 February 2005) was a Scottish writer of thirty published novels, the most celebrated being The Cone Gatherers. He also published two collections of short stories.

Career
John Robin Jenkins was born in Flemington near Cambuslang in 1912. His father died when he was only seven years old and he and his three siblings were brought up by his mother in straitened circumstances. However, he won a bursary to attend the former Hamilton Academy, then a famous fee-paying school. The theme of escaping circumstances through education at such a school was to form the basis of Jenkins's later novel Happy for the Child (1953)  Winning a scholarship, he subsequently studied Literature at the University of Glasgow, graduating in 1936. During the Second World War, he registered as a conscientious objector and was sent to work in forestry in Argyll (forestry work would re-appear in The Cone Gatherers). Upon release of his first novel, So Gaily Sings the Lark (also derived from his conscientious objector experience) in 1950, he adopted the pen name 'Robin Jenkins'.

In the early years of his writing career, Jenkins worked as an English and History teacher. In the 1950s, he taught at Riverside Senior Secondary in Glasgow's East End and later moved with his family to Dunoon, where he taught at the prestigious Dunoon Grammar School. He also spent four formative years at the Gaya School in Sabah, Borneo, living there with his wife May and their children. Before that, he had held British Council teaching posts in both Kabul and Barcelona.

His best-known novel, The Cone Gatherers, is based upon his forestry work as a conscientious objector and is often studied in Scottish schools. While The Cone Gatherers has been criticised as being devoid of any real sense of place, other novels such as The Thistle and the Grail, his 1954 football story, paint vivid pictures of more accessible settings. His writing typically touches on many themes, including morality, the struggle between good and evil, war, class and social justice. Just Duffy is another of his novels which focuses on such themes, in a style which has been compared to that of the earlier Scottish writer, James Hogg.

Jenkins was awarded the OBE in 1999 and in 2003 received the Andrew Fletcher of Saltoun prize from the Saltire Society for his lifetime achievement. His portrait, by Jennifer McRae, is in the collection of the National Portrait Gallery of Scotland. The Robin Jenkins Literary Award has been established in his name.

Robin Jenkins died in 2005, aged 92; his novel The Pearl-fishers was published posthumously in 2007.

Bibliography

Books
 So Gaily Sings the Lark (1950)
 Happy for the Child (1953)
 The Thistle and the Grail (1954)
 The Cone Gatherers (1955)
 Guests of War (1956)
 The Missionaries (1957)
 The Changeling (1958)
 Love Is a Fervent Fire (1959)
 Some Kind of Grace (1960)
 Dust on the Paw (1961)
 The Tiger of Gold (1962)
 A Love of Innocence (1963)
 The Sardana Dancers (1964)
 A Very Scotch Affair (1968)
 Holy Tree (1969)
 The Expatriates (1971)
 A Toast to the Lord (1972)
 Far Cry from Bowmore and Other Stories (1973) (short story collection)
 A Figure of Fun (1974)
 A Would-be Saint (1978)
 Fergus Lamont (1979)
 The Awakening of George Darroch (1985)
 Just Duffy (1988)
 Poverty Castle (1991)
 Willie Hogg (1993)
 Leila (1995)
 Lunderston Tales (1996) (short story collection)
 Matthew and Sheila (1998)
 Poor Angus (2000)
 Childish Things (2001)
 Lady Magdalen (2003)
 The Pearl-fishers (†, 2007)

Articles
 'Speaking as a Scot', in Lindsay, Maurice (ed.), The Scottish Review: Arts and Environment, 27 August 1982, pp. 18 & 19,

Reviews
 Magnusson, Magnus (1961), review of Dust on the Paw, in Gordon, Giles and Scott-Moncrieff, Michael (eds.). New Saltire 2: Autumn 1961, The Saltire Society, Edinburgh, pp. 66 & 67
 Craig, David (1980), review of Fergus Lamont, in Cencrastus No. 2, Spring 1980, pp. 39 – 41, 
 Review of The Conegatherers, in Cencrastus No. 4, Winter 1980-81, p. 47,

References

Further reading
 Thompson, Alastair R. (1962), Faith and Love: An Examination of Some Themes in the Novels of Robin Jenkins, in Gordon, Giles and Scott- Moncrieff, Michael (eds.), New Saltire 3: Spring 1962, The Saltire Society, Edinburgh, pp. 57 – 64

External links
 BBC page on Robin Jenkins
 Brian Mortons' appreciation of Jenkins' life
 Iain Crichton Smith's 'Scotnote' on 'The Cone Gatherers' https://web.archive.org/web/20100712113920/http://asls.org.uk/Scotnotes
 The Robin Jenkins Award web site

1912 births
2005 deaths
People educated at Hamilton Academy
People from Cambuslang
Officers of the Order of the British Empire
British conscientious objectors
Scottish conscientious objectors
20th-century Scottish novelists